Anton Amelchenko ( (Anton Amelchanka); ; born 27 March 1985) is a Belarusian football coach and a former player. He works as a goalkeeping coach with Slavia Mozyr. He earned several caps for Belarus national side between 2007 and 2011.

External links
 
 
 

1985 births
Living people
Sportspeople from Gomel
Belarusian footballers
Belarusian expatriate footballers
Belarus international footballers
Belarusian expatriate sportspeople in Russia
Association football goalkeepers
Russian Premier League players
Expatriate footballers in Russia
FC Gomel players
FC Moscow players
FC Rostov players
FC Lokomotiv Moscow players
FC Akhmat Grozny players
FC Fakel Voronezh players
FC Belshina Bobruisk players
FC Krumkachy Minsk players